Chondrostega is a genus of moths in the family Lasiocampidae. The genus was erected by Julius Lederer in 1858.

Species
Chondrostega aurivillii Püngeler, 1902
Chondrostega barbaresques
Chondrostega brunneicornis Wiltshire, 1944
Chondrostega constantina
Chondrostega constantina Aurivillius, 1894 Tunisia, Algeria, Morocco
Chondrostega darius Wiltshire, 1952
Chondrostega fasciana Staudinger, [1892]
Chondrostega feisali
Chondrostega goetschmanni Sterz, 1915
Chondrostega hyrcana Staudinger, 1871 Turkmenia, Uzbekistan, Tajikistan
Chondrostega intacta
Chondrostega longespinata Aurivillius, 1894
Chondrostega maghrebica
Chondrostega misuratana
Chondrostega murina Aurivillus, 1927
Chondrostega nigrifusa
Chondrostega osthelderi Püngeler, 1925 Asia Minor
Chondrostega palaestrana Staudinger, [1892]
Chondrostega pastrana Lederer, 1858 Asia Minor
Chondrostega pauli
Chondrostega powelli
Chondrostega pujoli
Chondrostega subfasciata Klug, 1830
Chondrostega tingitana Powell, 1916 Morocco
Chondrostega vandalicia (Millière, 1865)

References

Lasiocampidae